Johan Cornelius "Snövit" Richthoff (30 April 1898 – 1 October 1983) was a Swedish wrestler. He competed in the freestyle heavyweight division at the 1924, 1928 and 1932 Summer Olympics and won gold medals in 1928 and 1932; he shared fourth place in 1924.

Richthoff was born to a fisherman in a family of six, and trained in football and athletics before changing to wrestling. Besides his Olympic medals, he won the European titles in light-heavyweight freestyle in 1929 and 1930, and in Greco-Roman wrestling in 1930. Later that year he became the first wrestler to receive the Svenska Dagbladet Gold Medal. After the 1932 Olympics he wrestled professionally in the United States, and won 92 bouts out of 100, drawing 8 and losing none. In 1933 he returned to Sweden to prepare the national wrestling team to the 1936 Olympics, and continued to wrestle professionally until age 49. Richthoff was a Free Church preacher who campaigned against alcoholism. He was also active in music, literature and chess.

References

External links

profile

1898 births
1983 deaths
People from Malmö Municipality
Olympic wrestlers of Sweden
Wrestlers at the 1924 Summer Olympics
Wrestlers at the 1928 Summer Olympics
Wrestlers at the 1932 Summer Olympics
Swedish male sport wrestlers
Olympic gold medalists for Sweden
Olympic medalists in wrestling
Medalists at the 1928 Summer Olympics
Medalists at the 1932 Summer Olympics
Sportspeople from Skåne County
20th-century Swedish people